The discography of the English alternative rock band Suede consists of nine studio albums, four compilation albums, five video albums and over twenty singles. Suede were formed in 1989 by singer Brett Anderson, bassist Mat Osman and guitarist Justine Frischmann. Guitarist Bernard Butler later joined after the group responded to an ad in the Melody Maker. The group played as a four-piece with a drum machine until drummer Simon Gilbert joined. Frischmann left before the group released any material.

Despite the media frenzy that surrounded the group, their 1992 debut single "The Drowners" only peaked at number 49 on the UK Singles Chart. It would not be until the release of their third single, "Animal Nitrate", that Suede would break into the top ten, with the song peaking at number seven following their performance of it at the 1993 BRIT Awards.

Suede became associated with the Britpop movement of the period and achieved commercial success throughout the United Kingdom, with three of the group's five studio albums charting at number one. Their popularity throughout the rest of the world varied throughout the group's lifetime, but had several charting hits in Denmark, Finland, Norway and Sweden. Suede's commercial success in the United States was limited, and due to a lawsuit with an American singer with the same name, the group had to change its name for the American market to The London Suede. Despite the lack of commercial success in the US, the four studio albums released in America all charted on Billboards Top Heatseekers chart, though the group never charted on the Billboard 200. Suede also had three minor hits in the US, with "Metal Mickey" peaking at number seven on the Modern Rock Tracks in 1993, "Everything Will Flow" charting at number 28 on the Hot Dance Music/Club Play chart in 1999 and "Hit Me" in 2013.

Butler left while the band were recording Dog Man Star and was soon replaced by Richard Oakes. Keyboardist Neil Codling joined the group for Dog Man Star'''s follow-up Coming Up. Following a commercial resurgence with Coming Up and 1999s Head Music, Codling left in 2001 due to complications with chronic fatigue syndrome and was replaced by former Strangelove keyboardist Alex Lee.

After a long and expensive recording span, A New Morning was released in 2002 and was a commercial and critical disappointment in the UK. The first single released from A New Morning, "Positivity", became the group's only single to chart in Canada, and peaked at number one in Denmark.

In November 2003, Suede released the compilation album Singles which included all 19 of their previously released singles, and also contained two new songs, "Attitude" (itself released as a single along with the non-album "Golden Gun" to promote the album) and "Love the Way You Love Me". Following the release of Singles Suede announced they were disbanding at the end of 2003.

Reforming in 2010 to play a concert for the Teenage Cancer Trust Foundation, the band decided to start recording again. 2013 saw the release of Bloodsports. An even more successful album followed in 2016 with Night Thoughts''.

Albums

Studio albums

Compilation albums

Live albums

Box sets

Singles

Video albums

Music videos

Notes

References

Discographies of British artists
Rock music group discographies